Émile Aubry (8 April 1829, Rouen – 23 February 1900, Ivry-sur-Seine) was a French printer active in the workers' movement in Rouen. He was corresponding secretary of the Federation of Rouen Workers, the local branch of the International Workingmen's Association (IWA). In 1869 he was a delegate to the Basel Congress of the IWA.

References

1829 births
1900 deaths
French printers
Members of the International Workingmen's Association